The 64th British Academy Film Awards, more commonly known as the BAFAs (or BAFTAs), were held on 13 February 2011 at the Royal Opera House in London, honouring the best national and foreign films of 2010. The nominations were announced on 18 January 2011. Presented by the British Academy of Film and Television Arts, accolades are handed out for the best feature-length film and documentaries of any nationality that were screened at British cinemas in 2010. The King's Speech earned the most nominations with fourteen and won seven, including Best Film, Outstanding British Film, Best Actor for Colin Firth, Best Supporting Actor for Geoffrey Rush, Best Supporting Actress for Helena Bonham Carter, and Best Original Screenplay for David Seidler. Natalie Portman won Best Actress for Black Swan and David Fincher won Best Director for The Social Network.

Winners and nominees

BAFTA Fellowship
 Sir Christopher Lee

Outstanding British Contribution to Cinema
 Harry Potter film series''

Statistics

See also

 83rd Academy Awards
 36th César Awards
 16th Critics' Choice Awards
 63rd Directors Guild of America Awards
 24th European Film Awards
 68th Golden Globe Awards
 31st Golden Raspberry Awards
 25th Goya Awards
 26th Independent Spirit Awards
 16th Lumières Awards
 1st Magritte Awards
 22nd Producers Guild of America Awards
 15th Satellite Awards
 37th Saturn Awards
 17th Screen Actors Guild Awards
 63rd Writers Guild of America Awards

In Memoriam

 John Barry
 Tony Curtis
 Alan Hume
 Blake Edwards
 Roy Ward Baker
 Arthur Penn
 Dede Allen
 Bernd Eichinger
 Leslie Nielsen
 Maria Schneider
 Clive Donner
 Dennis Hopper
 Sally Menke
 Peter Yates
 Guido Coen
 Ingrid Pitt
 Norman Wisdom
 Tura Satana
 Susannah York
 Carol Marsh
 Ronald Neame
 Dino De Laurentiis
 Patricia Neal
 Corey Haim
 Claude Chabrol
 Pete Postlethwaite

References

External links
 Film in 2011  BAFTA Awards at BAFTA

Film064
2011 in London
2010 film awards
Royal Opera House
2011 in British cinema
2010 awards in the United Kingdom
February 2011 events in the United Kingdom